Bain is a locality in Alberta, Canada.

Bain has the name of James Bain, a railroad official.

References 

Localities in Cypress County